Lucky is the second solo album by Marty Balin. It was released in 1983 on EMI America Records. The album did not fare as well as his previous one, and only rose to #156 on the Billboard chart. As a subtle tribute to Balin's friend and former bandmate Jack Casady, he recorded a cover of "Heart of Stone," an original written by Brian Marnell from Jack's new wave group SVT.

Track listing

Side one
"Born to Be a Winner" (Julio de Caro, Steve Head) – 4:22
"What Do People Like?" (de Caro) – 3:49
"Just Like That" (Steve Goldstein, Bob Getter, Adrian Peritore) – 2:49
"Do It for Love" (Jesse Barish) – 4:07
"What Love Is" (Greg Prestopino, Brock Walsh) – 4:44

Side two
"Heart of Stone" (Brian Marnell) – 3:13
"Palm of Your Hand" (Rick Marotta/Debra Barsha/Bob Alan) – 3:53
"Will You Forever" (John Farey/John Whitney) – 3:20
"All We Really Need" (Marty Balin/Franne Golde/Steve Goldstein/Peter Ivers) – 3:55
"When Love Comes" (Gene Heart/David Evan) – 3:18

CD release

BGO released "Lucky" as part of a 2 albums on one CD release with "Balin" in March 2013. Andrew Thompson remastered both albums for the CD release.

Charts

Singles

Personnel
Marty Balin – vocals
Steve Goldstein – keyboards, synthesizers
Louis Biancaniello – synthesizers
Waddy Wachtel – guitars
Kevin McCormick – bass
Rick Marotta – drums
M. L. Benoit – percussion

Additional Personnel
Daniel Moore, Matthew Moore, Bill Champlin – background vocals
William Bergman, Darrell Leonard, Jerry Paterson, Jim Price, Michael D. Slusher, Greg Smith, Lee Thornburg, Kenneth W. Tussing – horn players

Production
A Great Pyramid Ltd. Production
Val Garay – producer, recordist
Niko Bolas – assistant producer
Richard Bosworth – assistant to assistant producer
Mastered at The Mastering Lab, Hollywood by Doug Sax
Andy Engel – lettering
Aaron Rapoport – photography
Kosh and Ron Larson – design, art direction
Jimmie Haskell – strings arrangement and conductor
Sidney Sharp – concert master
Lee Thornburg, Steve Goldstein – horn arrangement

References

1983 albums
Marty Balin albums
Albums produced by Val Garay
Albums arranged by Jimmie Haskell
EMI America Records albums